Urteh Dasht (also Romanized as Ūrţeh Dasht; also known as ‘Ūr Dasht, ‘Ūrţ, and ‘Ūrţasht) is a village in Harazpey-ye Shomali Rural District, Sorkhrud District, Mahmudabad County, Mazandaran Province, Iran. At the 2006 census, its population was 336, in 88 families.

References 

Populated places in Mahmudabad County